Earle Alfred Birney  (13 May 1904 – 3 September 1995) was a Canadian poet and novelist, who twice won the Governor General's Award, Canada's top literary honour, for his poetry.

Life
Born in Calgary, Alberta, and raised on a farm in Erickson, near Creston, British Columbia, his childhood was somewhat isolated. After working as a farm hand, a bank clerk, and a park ranger, Birney went on to college to study chemical engineering but graduated with a degree in English.  He studied at the University of British Columbia, University of Toronto, University of California, Berkeley and University of London. During his year in Toronto he became a Marxist–Leninist. Through a brief and quickly annulled marriage to Sylvia Johnston, he was introduced to Trotskyism. In the 1930s he was an active Trotskyist in Canada, the USA and Britain and was the leading figure in the Socialist Workers League but disagreed with the Trotskyist position on World War II and left the movement.

During the conflict, he served as a personnel officer in the Canadian Army (an experience that he used in his 1949 novel, Turvey).

In 1946, Birney began teaching at the University of British Columbia, "where he founded and directed the first Canadian creative writing programme." His work led to the establishment of Canada's first Department of Creative Writing at UBC.

In 1995, Birney died of a heart attack.

Writing

Fiction
Birney's World War II experiences inspired the creation of the title character of his comic military novel, Turvey (1949), a saga of one hapless soldier's struggle to get to 'the sharp end' of the fighting in the Netherlands and Germany during 1944–45. The character of Turvey is a fascinating melange of country boy innocent, common sense utilitarian and town fool, and seems to have been fashioned as a foil to the eccentrically pseudo-sophisticated Canadian military life as illustrated in the novel. The book has been described as "uproariously ribald", winning the Stephen Leacock Medal for Humour. Turvey was a hit in Canada, selling 30,000 copies.

Birney published his second novel, Down the Long Table, a Marxist novel about the Great Depression, in 1955. It did not match the first novel's success.

Poetry
Beginning with David and Other Poems (1942), was published during his tenure at the University of Toronto. Birney's poetry consistently explored the resources of language with passionate and playful curiosity. That first volume won Birney a Governor General's Award in 1942. The title work, "a poem about euthanasia, became quite a controversial poem, frequently anthologized and taught in Canadian literature courses." "A generation of Canadian schoolchildren and university students has grown up knowing the story," Al Purdy wrote in 1974. "At one time or another in the last 25 years, "David" has been required reading for high schools and universities in every Canadian province."

His second book of poetry, Now Is Time, won Birney a second Governor General's Award in 1945.

By the time of Birney's Trial of a City and other Verse in 1952, literary critic Northrop Frye was calling him one of "Canada's two leading poets" (the other being E. J. Pratt).

The Royal Society of Canada awarded Birney its Lorne Pierce Medal for literature in 1953.

In the mid-1960s Birney collaborated with electronic composer Terry Rusling on CBC Radio. A poem was performed combined with electronic music and afterwards they discussed their respective work and experimental approaches.

Birney's typography became increasingly more experimental during the 1960s, and in his 1966 Selected Poems he revised many of his older poems, dropping punctuation and sentence structure. He explained his reasoning in the preface to that book:

In 1970 Birney was made an Officer of the Order of Canada.

In 1974, Birney was still being called "one of the two best poets in Canada," this time by Al Purdy (the other being Irving Layton).

In 1982 Birney recorded Nexus & Earle Birney, a triple-album collaboration with avant-garde percussion group Nexus.

The Canadian Encyclopedia sums up: "In long poems and lyrics, sight poems, sound poems and found poems, whether on the page or in his collection of recorded poems with the percussion ensemble NEXUS (1982), Birney demonstrated his deep commitment to making language have meaning in every possible and eloquent way."

Publications

Poetry
 David and Other Poems. Toronto: Ryerson Press, 1942.
 Now Is Time. Toronto: Ryerson Press, 1945.
 The Strait of Anian. Toronto: Ryerson Press, 1948.
 Trial of a City and Other Verse. Toronto: Ryerson, 1952.
 Ice Cod Bell or Stone. Toronto: McClelland and Stewart, 1962.
 Near False Creek Mouth. Toronto: McClelland and Stewart, 1964.
 Two Poems. Halifax, 1964.
 Selected Poems: 1940–1966. Toronto: McClelland and Stewart, 1966.
 Memory No Servant, 1968.
 The Poems of Earle Birney: a New Canadian Library selection (New Canadian library original N06), Toronto: McClelland and Stewart, 1969.
 pnomes jukollages & other stunzas, 1969.
 Rag & Bone Shop. Toronto: McClelland and Stewart, 1970.
 The Bear on the Delhi Road: selected poems. London: Chatto & Windus, 1973.
 what's so big about GREEN?. Toronto: McClelland and Stewart, 1973.
 The Collected Poems of Earle Birney. Toronto: McClelland and Stewart, 1975.
 Alphabeings and Other Seasyours. London, Ont.: Pikadilly Press, 1976.
 The Rugging and the Moving Times: Poems New and Uncollected 1976. Coatsworth, ON: Black Moss Press, 1976.
 Ghost in the Wheels: Selected Poems. Toronto: McClelland and Stewart, 1977.
 Fall by Fury & Other Makings. Toronto: McClelland and Stewart, 1978.
 The Mammoth Corridors. Okemos, MI.: Stone Press, 1980.
 Copernican Fix. Toronto: ECW Press, 1985.
 Last Makings: Poems. Toronto: McClelland & Stewart, 1991.
 One Muddy Hand: Selected Poems, Sam Solecki (ed.), 2006.
 The Essential Earle Birney, Jim Johnstone (ed.), 2014.
 January Morning/Downtown Vancouver.

Fiction
 Turvey: a military picaresque. Toronto: McClelland & Stewart, 1949.
 Down the Long Table. Toronto: McClelland & Stewart, 1955.
 Big Bird in the Bush: Selected stories and sketches. Oakville, ON: Mosaic Press, 1978.

Non-fiction
 The Creative Writer, 1966
 The Cow Jumped Over the Moon: The writing and reading of poetry, Toronto: Holt, Rinehart and Winston, 1972.
 Essays on Chaucerian Irony, 1985.
 Spreading Time: Remarks on Canadian Writing and Writers, 1904–1949, 1989.
 Conversations with Trotsky, Earle Birney and the Radical 1930s: collected Trotskyist writings of Birney and related material published under the direction of Bruce Nesbitt, University of Ottawa press, 2017, .

Plays
 The Damnation of Vancouver. New Canadian Library original; N 011. Toronto: McClelland & Stewart, 1977.
 Words on Waves: selected radio plays of Earle Birney. Kingston, ON: Quarry Press & CBC Enterprises, 1985.

Edited
 Twentieth Century Canadian Poetry, an anthology with introduction and notes. Toronto: Ryerson Press, 1953.
 Four parts sand. New Canadian poets. [Ottawa]: Oberon Press, 1972.

Except where noted, bibliographic information courtesy University of Toronto.

Discography
 Nexus & Earle Birney (Nexus, 1982)
 Celebration: Famous Canadian Poets on CD (with Irving Layton) (Canadian Poetry Association 2001) .

Filmography
Writer (4 titles)
 1995: Trawna Tuh Belvul
1993: David (short) (poem)
 1983: Aloud (short) (poem)
 1970: Espolio (short) (poem)

Actor (1 title)
 1983:  Aloud (short) Reciter

Self (3 titles)
 1993: View from the Typewriter; Himself
 1981: Earle Birney: Portrait of a Poet; Himself
 1965: Ladies and Gentlemen... Mr. Leonard Cohen (documentary)(uncredited)

Except where noted, film information from Internet Movie Database.

See also

Canadian literature
Canadian poetry
List of Canadian poets

References
Elspeth Cameron. Earle Birney: A Life. Toronto: Viking, 1994.

Notes

External links
Canadian Poetry Online: Earle Birney - Biography and 6 poems ("Vancouver Lights", "From the Hazel Bough", "Sestina for the Ladies of Tehuántepec", "The Bear on the Delhi Road", "El Greco: Espolito", "Plaza de la Inquisición")
Earle Birney in The Canadian Encyclopedia
Order of Canada Citation
University of British Columbia Archives

 Earle Birney Papers at the Thomas Fisher Rare Book Library

1904 births
1995 deaths
20th-century Canadian poets
20th-century Canadian male writers
Canadian male poets
University of British Columbia alumni
University of California, Berkeley alumni
Alumni of the University of London
Canadian military personnel of World War II
Canadian socialists
Canadian Trotskyists
Fellows of the Royal Society of Canada
Governor General's Award-winning poets
Canadian modernist poets
Officers of the Order of Canada
Writers from Calgary
Stephen Leacock Award winners
University of Toronto alumni
Writers from Vancouver